Kindred Spirits is a children's choir from the London area with over 20 members between the ages of 6 and 14 years old.

Recording Contract
Kindred Spirits signed a recording contract with EMI Classics and recorded their first album in Summer 2007 featuring a selection of classical and popular songs including the folksong O Waly Waly, the Christmas carol In the Bleak Midwinter, Perfect Day from the Beatrix Potter film, and a cover version of the Coldplay hit song Fix You. Their debut album was released on 10 December 2007, but failed to make in impact, despite being nominated for 'Album of 2008' by Classic FM.

Their first major appearance together was a performance at the Horse of the Year Show in October 2007 which was broadcast on Sky TV channel. They were also on BBC's Strictly Come Dancing Christmas Special.

Kindred Spirits were dropped from EMI in January 2008 following poor album sales.

The Myleene Klass Connection
Myleene Klass in her role as label ambassador for EMI Classics heard an early demo of the choir and expressed interest in being involved in the project. As a new mother, her support of the children's choir seems a perfect match.

References
Horse of the Year Show
Crufts

Choirs of children